The Apfelgroschen is an historical German coin that was a type of Guter Groschen ("good groschen"). It was minted from about 1570 and was so called because it depicted the imperial orb (Reichsapfel, literally "imperial apple") with the inscription "24" (i. e. 24 pieces = 1 Reichsthaler) on one side.

References

External links 

Silver coins
Coins of the Holy Roman Empire
Groschen